In physics and engineering, mass flux is the rate of mass flow. Its SI units are kg m−2 s−1. The common symbols are j, J, q, Q, φ, or Φ (Greek lower or capital Phi), sometimes with subscript m to indicate mass is the flowing quantity. Mass flux can also refer to an alternate form of flux in Fick's law that includes the molecular mass, or in Darcy's law that includes the mass density.

Sometimes the defining equation for mass flux in this article is used interchangeably with the defining equation in mass flow rate. For example, Fluid Mechanics, Schaum's et al  uses the definition of mass flux as the equation in the mass flow rate article.

Definition

Mathematically, mass flux is defined as the limit

where

The area required to calculate the flux is real or imaginary, flat or curved, either as a cross-sectional area or a surface.

For example, for substances passing through a filter or a membrane, the real surface is the (generally curved) surface area of the filter, macroscopically - ignoring the area spanned by the holes in the filter/membrane. The spaces would be cross-sectional areas. For liquids passing through a pipe, the area is the cross-section of the pipe, at the section considered.

The vector area is a combination of the magnitude of the area through which the mass passes through, A, and a unit vector normal to the area, .

If the mass flux  passes through the area at an angle θ to the area normal , then

where  is the dot product of the unit vectors. The only component of mass flux passing normal to the area is the cosine component.

Example

Consider a pipe of flowing water. Suppose the pipe has a constant cross section and we consider a straight section of it (not at any bends/junctions), and the water is flowing steadily at a constant rate, under standard conditions. The area A is the cross-sectional area of the pipe. Suppose the pipe has radius . The area is then 

To calculate the mass flux  (magnitude), we also need the amount of mass of water transferred through the area and the time taken. Suppose a volume  passes through in time t = 2 s.

Substituting the numbers gives:

which is approximately 596.8 kg s−1 m−2.

Equations for fluids

Alternative equation

Using the vector definition, mass flux is also equal to:

where:
  = mass density,
  = velocity field of mass elements flowing (i.e. at each point in space the velocity of an element of matter is some velocity vector ).

Sometimes this equation may be used to define  as a vector.

Mass and molar fluxes for composite fluids

Mass fluxes

In the case fluid is not pure, i.e. is a mixture of substances (technically contains a number of component substances), the mass fluxes must be considered separately for each component of the mixture.

When describing fluid flow (i.e. flow of matter), mass flux is appropriate. When describing particle transport (movement of a large number of particles), it is useful to use an analogous quantity, called the molar flux.

Using mass, the mass flux of component i is

The barycentric mass flux of component i is

where  is the average mass velocity of all the components in the mixture, given by

where
  = mass density of the entire mixture,
  = mass density of component i,
  = velocity of component i.

The average is taken over the velocities of the components.

Molar fluxes

If we replace density  by the "molar density", concentration , we have the molar flux analogues.

The molar flux is the number of moles per unit time per unit area, generally:

So the molar flux of component i is (number of moles per unit time per unit area):

and the barycentric molar flux of component i is

where  this time is the average molar velocity of all the components in the mixture, given by:

Usage

Mass flux appears in some equations in hydrodynamics, in particular the continuity equation:

which is a statement of the mass conservation of fluid. In hydrodynamics, mass can only flow from one place to another.

Molar flux occurs in Fick's first law of diffusion:

where  is the diffusion coefficient.

See also
Mass-flux fraction
Flux
Fick's law
Darcy's law
Wave mass flux and wave momentum
Defining equation (physics)
Defining equation (physical chemistry)

References

Physical quantities
Vector calculus